Wazi Uddin Khan (20 February 1936 – 31 January 2020) was a Bangladeshi freedom fighter and politician from Pabna belonging to Bangladesh Awami League. He was elected twice as a member of the Jatiya Sangsad.

Biography
Khan was born on 20 February 1936 at Vajpara in Pabna. He took part in the Liberation War of Bangladesh in 1971.

Khan was elected as the general secretary of Pabna District Motor Workers' Union in 1972. He was elected as the president of the Bangladesh Road Transport Workers' Federation in 1980 and served in that post till his death.

Khan served as the president of Pabna District unit of Bangladesh Awami League for 25 years. He was elected as a member of the Jatiya Sangsad from Pabna-3 in 1986. He was also elected from that constituency in the  Seventh Jatiya Sangsad Election.

Khan died on 31 January 2020 at his own residence at Atua Housepara in Pabna at the age of 83.

References

1936 births
2020 deaths
3rd Jatiya Sangsad members
7th Jatiya Sangsad members
People from Pabna District
Awami League politicians
People of the Bangladesh Liberation War